Storm at Daybreak is a 1933 American pre-Code drama film directed by Richard Boleslawski, written by Bertram Millhauser, and starring Kay Francis, Nils Asther, Walter Huston, Phillips Holmes, Eugene Pallette and C. Henry Gordon. It was released on July 14, 1933, by Metro-Goldwyn-Mayer.

Premise
The wife of a Serbian mayor engages in a clandestine affair with her husband's best friend, a Hungarian officer.

Cast 
 Kay Francis as Irina Radovic
 Nils Asther as Capt. Geza Petery
 Walter Huston as Mayor Dushan Radovic
 Phillips Holmes as Csaholyi
 Eugene Pallette as Janos
 C. Henry Gordon as Panto Nikitch
 Frank Burk as Jankovitcch (uncredited)
 Louise Closser Hale as Militza Brooska
 Jean Parker as Danitza
 Mischa Auer as Assassin (uncredited) 
 Frank Conroy as Archduke Franz Ferdinand (uncredited)
 Leonid Kinskey as Villager (uncredited) 
 Akim Tamiroff as Fiddler (uncredited)

Critical reception
The New York Times wrote, "although Richard Boleslavsky has made a good looking production and filled it with the huzzahs and halloos that go with picturesque costumes and romantic warfare, Storm at Daybreak is a dull entertainment."

References

External links
 

 
 

1933 films
1933 drama films
Adultery in films
American drama films
American black-and-white films
Films directed by Ryszard Bolesławski
Films set in 1914
Films set in Austria
Films set in Hungary
Films set in Sarajevo
Metro-Goldwyn-Mayer films
Cultural depictions of Gavrilo Princip
1930s English-language films
1930s American films